David John Astley (11 October 1909 – 7 November 1989) was a Welsh international footballer who played as an inside forward in The Football League in the 1920s and 1930s.

Club career
Dowlais-born Astley played for Merthyr Town, Charlton, Aston Villa, Derby County, Blackpool and Metz. He scored 92 goals for Aston Villa in 165 matches.

Astley made his league debut on 19 November 1927 against Bournemouth & Boscombe Athletic. When Albert Lindon was appointed player-manager at Charlton Athletic in January 1928, he signed Astley for £100. Astley made his debut for Blackpool, then under the managership of Joe Smith, two-thirds of the way through the 1938–39 campaign, in a 1–1 draw with Sunderland at Bloomfield Road on 25 January 1939. He went on to make a further sixteen League appearances before the season's end, scoring six goals. In  1939–40, he appeared in the three League games that occurred prior to the competition being abandoned as a result of the outbreak of World War II.

After the war, he joined FC Metz, where he spent a year.

International career
He was capped 13 times for the Wales national football team, scoring on 12 occasions. He scored two goals in Wales' final match of the 1933 British Home Championship, a 4–1 victory over Ireland which gave Wales the title.

Management
Astley managed Djurgårdens IF and Sandvikens IF in Sweden from 1950 to 1954 and from 1955 to 1957, as well as Inter Milan during 1948 and Genoa C.F.C. 1949.

References

1909 births
1989 deaths
Welsh footballers
Wales international footballers
Welsh football managers
People from Dowlais
Sportspeople from Merthyr Tydfil County Borough
Association football inside forwards
FC Metz players
Ligue 1 players
Blackpool F.C. players
Aston Villa F.C. players
Charlton Athletic F.C. players
Derby County F.C. players
English Football League players
Welsh expatriate footballers
Expatriate footballers in France
Welsh expatriate sportspeople in France
Expatriate football managers in Italy
Welsh expatriate sportspeople in Italy
Expatriate football managers in Sweden
Welsh expatriate sportspeople in Sweden
Welsh expatriate football managers
Inter Milan managers
Genoa C.F.C. managers
Djurgårdens IF Fotboll managers
Sandvikens IF managers